Cheddars are a British brand of baked Cheddar cheese-flavoured savoury biscuit. They were originally manufactured and sold by Crawfords. Until 2014, Cheddars were marketed under the McVitie's brand, but are now marketed under the Jacob's brand.  Mini Cheddars continue to be marketed under the McVitie's brand in Ireland.  Cheddars are made with real cheese.

Varieties
Mini Cheddars were the result of product diversification by McVitie's in 1984–1985. New flavours were later introduced, including Marmite, BBQ Beef, Branston Pickle, Cheese & Onion, Ham & Cheese and Mature Cheddar. They are commonly sold as a snack in pubs throughout the United Kingdom.  

In 2015, a range of crispier, crinkled Mini Cheddars called Crinklys was launched, with flavours such as Cheese & Onion, Salt & Vinegar, Prawn Cocktail and Sweet Chili.

In 2017, three new cheese flavours were added to the range: Stilton, Red Leicester and Smoked Applewood. Also, they released their Mini Chedder Crispy Thins.

As of 2019, Jacob's Mini Cheddars are available in 8 flavours - Cheddar, Smoked Cheddar, BBQ, Red Leicester, Blue Stilton, Monterey Jack, Pepper Jack and Branston Pickle.

As of 2020 three new limited edition flavours were added; Nacho cheese & jalapeno, lime and chilli and chipotle chilli wings.

As of 2021, three new flavours were added; Ploughman's, Blue cheese and Chilli cheddar.

Cheddars Baked Cheese Biscuits are a larger version of the biscuit. Available in flavours such as; Cheddar Cheese, Pickle and Smoky BBQ.

External links 
 Mini Cheddars at the United Biscuits website

United Biscuits brands
British snack foods